Nebojša Koharović (born 17 May 1963 in Zagreb) is a Croatian diplomat and is the current Ambassador to China and Non-resident Ambassador to North Korea.

He served as an Ambassador Extraordinary and Plenipotentiary of the Republic of Croatia to the Republic of Poland, and later to the Russian Federation, presenting his Letter of Credence to President of Russia Dmitry Medvedev on 27 February 2009.

He was previously Assistant Minister of Foreign Affairs of Croatia, and in that role played a part in a series of bilateral visits on China - Croatia relations in 2002.

References 

Croatian diplomats
Living people
Ambassadors of Croatia to China
Ambassadors of Croatia to North Korea
Ambassadors of Croatia to Poland
Ambassadors of Croatia to Russia
1963 births